A Cappella is a 1985 album by Todd Rundgren. The album is one of Rundgren's most unusual in that every sound is the product of the artist's voice. Rundgren employed overdubbing techniques and an E-mu Emulator (an early sampler), electronically manipulating the sound of his voice to mimic conventional rock instruments, handclaps, and other sounds. This approach to music making was later explored by artists such as Mike Patton and Björk.

A Cappella was finished in 1984 and slated for release on Bearsville Records later that year. But with Bearsville's slimming artist roster and lack of successful artists, founder Albert Grossman did not want to risk releasing an album that he felt was too experimental and would not sell, so A Cappella was shelved. According to journalist Barney Hoskyns, Grossman's increasingly fractious relationship with Rundgren also factored into the decision. Bearsville filed for bankruptcy in 1985 and all of its remaining master recordings were either released through Warner Bros. or shelved altogether. Rundgren's Bearsville contract was acquired by Warner Bros. executive Mo Ostin, with Grossman (who died shortly thereafter) retaining ownership of Rundgren's publishing company.

A test pressing of A Cappella was copied and bootlegged under the title, "Runt A Cappella" (CATSVILLE TR-084), and may have influenced Warner Bros. to release the album since bootleggers were profiting from it. This same bootleg was also released as a high quality concert recording of an A Cappella live concert, taken from a recording at the Bismark Theater, on October 25, 1985, that was broadcast via the King Biscuit Flower Hour. The packaging of both bootlegs were the same, so it was unknown whether it was the studio LP or live LP until it was played.

A Cappella would also be Rundgren's first official album for Warner Bros. Records, following the demise of Bearsville Records, which Warner Bros. distributed. Rhino Records would subsequently acquire the rights to the album for release on CD and for online distribution. Following its release, Rundgren put his solo career on hold and would not release another studio album until 1989.

Track listing
All songs written by Todd Rundgren, except where indicated.

Side one
"Blue Orpheus" – 5:02
"Johnee Jingo" – 3:51
"Pretending to Care" – 3:40
"Hodja" – 3:25
"Lost Horizon" – 4:57

Side two
"Something to Fall Back On" – 4:13
"Miracle in the Bazaar" – 4:12
"Lockjaw" – 4:01
"Honest Work" – 2:40
"Mighty Love" (Joseph B. Jefferson, Bruce Hawes, Charles Simmons) – 3:41

Personnel
Todd Rundgren - all vocals and sounds, art direction, engineer, producer

Charts
Album

Cover versions and samples
British Asian musician Kindness sampled Pretending to Care on their song Cry Everything on their 2019 album Something Like a War.
American singer Jennifer Warnes covered "Pretending to Care" on her 1992 album The Hunter, which reached No. 13 on the Billboard Adult Contemporary chart. The song was also covered by Australian singer Daryl Braithwaite on his 1988 album Edge. Both versions featured traditional instrumentation. Singer (and Manhattan Transfer member) Janis Siegel also recorded the song for her 1989 album Short Stories, a collaboration with pianist Fred Hersch.
Guitarist Paul Gilbert covered "Blue Orpheus" on his 2010 album Fuzz Universe.
"Honest Work" has been covered by several Irish vocal acts, including Beyond the Pale, Cloudstreet, Pat Sheridan, and Maddy Prior.
"Hodja" was performed on the first season of the television series, Full House, and was sung by Jesse Katsopolis (John Stamos), along with his group of friends, The Rippers. 
 "Johnee Jingo" has been sampled on hip-hop songs "Drinks Up!" by Madlib and "Earl Flinn" by Slum Village, from the albums WLIB AM: King of the Wigflip and Villa Manifesto respectively.
 "Lost Horizons" was later sampled by Todd Rundgren himself for his track No World Order in 1993.

References 

Todd Rundgren albums
1985 albums
Albums produced by Todd Rundgren
A cappella albums